Sarah Pia Anderson (born 1952) is an English born television and theatre director, and Professor of Cinema and Digital Media at University of California, Davis. 

Her career in the theatre included work for the National Theatre: Rosmersholm, the Royal Shakespeare Company: Mary and Lizzie and the Abbey Theatre: Carthaginians. Her early television work included Prime Suspect 4: Inner Circles (1995), starring Helen Mirren. She has worked mainly in the United States since the mid-1990s, directing episodes of Dark Angel, Gilmore Girls, Dead Like Me, Grey's Anatomy, Veronica Mars and other series. In 2011, she directed the opening episodes of Scott & Bailey produced by RED Production Company for ITV1.

Television directing credits
Tommy (TV series)
The L Word: Generation Q (TV series)
Truth Be Told (miniseries)
Good Girls (TV series)
Awake (TV series)
Scott & Bailey (TV series)
Dead Like Me (TV series)
Big Love (TV series)
Ugly Betty (TV series)
Huff (TV series)
Veronica Mars (TV series) (Episode: "Return of the Kane")
Grey's Anatomy (TV series)
Ed (TV series)
Ally McBeal (TV series)
Dark Angel (TV series)
The Division (TV series)
Gilmore Girls (TV series)
Profiler (TV series)
ER (TV series)
Prime Suspect 4: Inner Circles (1995) (TV film)
Doctor Finlay (TV series)
Alleyn Mysteries (TV series)
Pity in History (1985) (TV film)
A Woman Calling (1984) (TV film)

References

External links
 
 

1952 births
Living people
English expatriates in the United States
English television directors
English theatre directors
British women television directors
People from St Albans
University of California, Davis faculty